7204 Ondřejov, provisional designation , is a stony asteroid from the middle region of the asteroid belt, approximately 6 kilometers in diameter. It was discovered on 3 April 1995, by Czech astronomer Petr Pravec at Ondřejov Observatory near Prague, Czech Republic.

This asteroid was the observatory's first numbered minor planet discovery. It was named for the Czech village of Ondřejov and its discovering observatory.

Orbit and classification 

Ondřejov orbits the Sun in the central main-belt at a distance of 2.3–3.0 AU once every 4 years and 4 months (1,594 days). Its orbit has an eccentricity of 0.12 and an inclination of 5° with respect to the ecliptic.

Physical characteristics

Rotation period 

In December 2011, a rotational lightcurve of Ondřejov was obtained from photometric observations taken at the Palomar Transient Factory in California. It showed a rotation period of  hours with a brightness variation of 0.55 magnitude.

Diameter and albedo 

According to the survey carried out by the NEOWISE mission of NASA's Wide-field Infrared Survey Explorer, the asteroid measures 5.9 kilometers in diameter and its surface has an albedo of 0.18, while the Collaborative Asteroid Lightcurve Link assumes a lower albedo of 0.10 and calculates a diameter of 6.3 kilometers with an absolute magnitude of 14.14.

Naming 

This minor planet was named for both, the Czech village of Ondřejov, and its discovering Ondřejov Observatory, founded in 1898.

Ondřejov is the Czech Republic's oldest astronomical observatory still in use. In 1953, the observatory was integrated into the Astronomical Institute and is now also owned by the Academy of Sciences of the Czech Republic. Ondřejov is located about 35 kilometers southeast of the country's capital, Prague. The approved naming citation was published by the Minor Planet Center on 22 February 1997.

References

External links 
 Asteroid Lightcurve Database (LCDB), query form (info )
 Dictionary of Minor Planet Names, Google books
 Asteroids and comets rotation curves, CdR – Observatoire de Genève, Raoul Behrend
 Discovery Circumstances: Numbered Minor Planets (5001)-(10000) – Minor Planet Center
 
 

007204
Discoveries by Petr Pravec
Named minor planets
19950403